Anderson is a city in the Denali Borough, Alaska, United States, and the borough's only incorporated community. At the 2010 census the population was 246, down from 367 at the 2000 census. At the 2020 census, the population dropped to 177 residents. The city is named after one of the original homesteaders.

History

Early years
Anderson is named after Arthur Anderson, one of several homesteaders who settled in the area in the late 1950s. In 1959, Anderson subdivided his homestead into house lots and sold most of the lots to civilian workers from Clear Air Force Station, a Ballistic Missile Early Warning System station completed in 1961. An elementary school was built in the community in 1961, and Anderson incorporated as a city on June 2, 1962.

In the 1960s, a road was completed between Anderson and Nenana. A ferry across the Tanana River at Nenana provided access to the Fairbanks–Nenana Highway, and hence to Fairbanks and the contiguous North American highway system via the Richardson and Alaska Highways.  The ferry was replaced with a bridge in 1968. In 1972, the George Parks Highway was completed, which provided direct road access to points south, including Anchorage.

21st century
In March 2007, the city announced a plan to attract more residents: the awarding of free land to interested applicants. This concept has been compared to that of the Homestead Act.

The Anderson/Clear Lions Club, in conjunction with commercial sponsors and Two Rivers-based concert promoters Acoustic Adventures, hosted the annual Anderson Bluegrass Festival. Held on the last weekend of every July from Friday through Sunday at Riverside Park, the festival was the city's significant visitor attraction. The festival was discontinued in 2012. It was replaced with a similar, privately run family music festival held in the same location starting in 2015.

Geography
Anderson is located at  (64.345372, -149.195352), abutting the northern border of the Denali Borough. The Anderson townsite lies in between the Alaska Railroad mainline and the Nenana River, along the northern edge of city limits. The George Parks Highway ( east of the townsite) and Clear Air Force Station ( south of the townsite) are also within city limits. Clear Air Force Station is home to the 213th Space Warning Squadron.

Anderson attracts mostly curious visitors, owing to its "out of the way" location at the end of a side road, plus those stopping to camp or access the Nenana River at Riverside Park.

Demographics

Anderson first appeared on the 1970 U.S. Census as a city, having incorporated in 1962.

As of the census of 2000, there were 367 people, 101 households, and 74 families residing in the city.  The population density was 7.9 people per square mile (3.0/km).  There were 148 housing units at an average density of 3.2 per square mile (1.2/km).  The racial makeup of the city was 86.38% White, 4.36% Black or African American, 1.36% Native American, 0.27% Asian, 0.82% from other races, and 6.81% from two or more races.  5.18% of the population were Hispanic or Latino of any race.

There were 101 households, out of which 40.6% had children under the age of 18 living with them, 56.4% were married couples living together, 10.9% had a female householder with no husband present, and 26.7% were non-families. 20.8% of all households were made up of individuals, and none had someone living alone who was 65 years of age or older.  The average household size was 2.60 and the average family size was 3.05.

In the city, the age distribution of the population shows 21.0% under the age of 18, 12.0% from 18 to 24, 42.0% from 25 to 44, 22.6% from 45 to 64, and 2.5% who were 65 years of age or older.  The median age was 33 years. For every 100 females, there were 175.9 males.  For every 100 females age 18 and over, there were 187.1 males.

The median income for a household in the city was $58,750, and the median income for a family was $62,188. Males had a median income of $31,641 versus $23,750 for females. The per capita income for the city was $23,837.  About 15.6% of families and 17.6% of the population were below the poverty line, including 25.8% of those under age 18 and 10.0% of those age 65 or over.

Education
K-12 students attend Anderson School, operated by the Denali Borough School District.

References

External links

  of the City of Anderson
 Anderson  at the Community Database Online from the Alaska Division of Community and Regional Affairs
 Maps from the Alaska Department of Labor and Workforce Development: 2000, 2010

Cities in Alaska
Cities in Denali Borough, Alaska